Steve Lofton (born November 26, 1968 in Jacksonville, Texas) is a former cornerback who played 9 seasons in the National Football League.

1968 births
Living people
People from Jacksonville, Texas
Players of American football from Texas
American football cornerbacks
Texas A&M Aggies football players
Montreal Machine players
Phoenix Cardinals players
Carolina Panthers players
New England Patriots players